The 2018–19 season was Unione Sportiva Sassuolo Calcio's sixth consecutive season in the top-flight of Italian football. The club competed in Serie A and the Coppa Italia.

Coach Giuseppe Iachini left the club on 5 June; he was replaced by former Palermo and Benevento coach Roberto De Zerbi on 13 June.

Players

Squad information

Appearances include league matches only

Transfers

In

Loans in

Out

Loans out

Competitions

Serie A

League table

Results summary

Results by round

Matches

Coppa Italia

Statistics

Appearances and goals

|-
! colspan=14 style=background:#DCDCDC; text-align:center| Goalkeepers

|-
! colspan=14 style=background:#DCDCDC; text-align:center| Defenders

|-
! colspan=14 style=background:#DCDCDC; text-align:center| Midfielders

|-
! colspan=14 style=background:#DCDCDC; text-align:center| Forwards

|-
! colspan=14 style=background:#DCDCDC; text-align:center| Players transferred out during the season

Goalscorers

Last updated: 26 May 2019

Clean sheets

Last updated: 26 May 2019

Disciplinary record

Last updated: 26 May 2019

References

U.S. Sassuolo Calcio seasons
Sassuolo